Bonnie and Clyde Italian Style, is a 1983 Italian comedy film directed by Steno.

Plot
Leo and Giada are two bumbling and bungling citizens who are mistaken for dangerous bandits because of a misunderstanding by the police. In fact during a robbery Leo and Giada were involved in the theft and they're taken hostage and the police tracked down the thieves when he discovered the identity cards of the two bungling. After several chases thieves before they reach the same Leo and Giada kidnapping them again, because the two unknowingly possess an important part of the loot stolen by bandits in the first shot he saw all the characters gathered together.

Cast 
Ornella Muti as  Rosetta Foschini aka Giada 
Paolo Villaggio as  Leo Gavazzi 
Jean Sorel as Carabinieri Captain 
Nando Murolo as  the Marsigliese 
Antonio Allocca as  Medico  
Fulvio Mingozzi as  Dr. Dominici 
Corrado Olmi as Toy merchant

Release
The film was released in Italy on February 17, 1983

See also
 List of Italian films of 1983

References

External links

1983 films
1983 comedy films
Films directed by Stefano Vanzina
Bonnie and Clyde
Films scored by Guido & Maurizio De Angelis
Films with screenplays by Luciano Vincenzoni
Films with screenplays by Sergio Donati
Italian comedy films
1980s Italian-language films
1980s Italian films